Mental Notes is the debut studio album by New Zealand band Split Enz. The album cover was painted by band member Phil Judd. Original vinyl copies featured Judd saying "Make a mental note" in the runout groove of the record's second side, causing the phrase to be looped ad infinitum on manual turntables until the stylus is removed.

Recording
Bassist Mike Chunn later complained about the "totally unsympathetic treatment we'd had when we were recording in Australia. The engineer in Sydney thought we couldn't tune our guitars and that we were unprofessional and he just showed total disinterest right through."

Much of the material derived from Tim Finn's and Phil Judd's fascination with the work of the renowned English writer and artist Mervyn Peake – notably "Spellbound" the epic track "Stranger Than Fiction" (their concert centrepiece) and "Titus", named after the hero of Peake's Gormenghast trilogy.

Track listing 

* These songs were re-recorded for the Second Thoughts album.
† This version has Phil Judd singing lead vocals. An earlier version (found on The Beginning of the Enz) recorded in 1974 has Tim Finn singing lead.

Personnel 
Split Enz
 Tim Finn - vocals, piano
 Phil Judd - vocals, acoustic guitar, electric guitar, mandolin
 Eddie Rayner - piano, mellotron, synthesizer, organ, clavinet, electric piano
 Wally Wilkinson - lead guitar
 Mike Chunn - bass, piano on 'Titus'
 Emlyn Crowther - drums
 Noel Crombie - percussion

Charts

References 

Split Enz albums
1975 debut albums
Chrysalis Records albums
Mushroom Records albums